Alexandra Ledermann (born 14 May 1969) is a French equestrian and Olympic medalist. She won a bronze medal in show jumping at the 1996 Summer Olympics in Atlanta.

Ledermann was born in Évreux in 1969. In 1999, she became the first woman to win gold at the European Show Jumping Championships. As of 2019, Ledermann and Meredith Michaels-Beerbaum of Germany were the only two women to have won this title.

Ledermann lends her name to a series of equestrian-themed video games.

References

External links

Her clothing and horse equipment store can be found on www.alsportswear.com

1969 births
Living people
French female equestrians
Olympic equestrians of France
Olympic bronze medalists for France
Equestrians at the 1996 Summer Olympics
Equestrians at the 2000 Summer Olympics
Olympic medalists in equestrian
Place of birth missing (living people)
Medalists at the 1996 Summer Olympics